Idenau is a town and capital of the West Coast district in Cameroon, near Bibundi west of Mount Cameroon. The name was given to this place while Cameroon was a German colony.

Today, Idenau has a small harbour and some oil palm plantations.

Gallery

See also
Communes of Cameroon
South-West Region
Ambazonia
Limbe, Cameroon

References
 Site de la primature - Élections municipales 2002 
 Contrôle de gestion et performance des services publics communaux des villes camerounaises - Thèse de Donation Avele, Université Montesquieu Bordeaux IV 
 Charles Nanga, La réforme de l’administration territoriale au Cameroun à la lumière de la loi constitutionnelle n° 96/06 du 18 janvier 1996, Mémoire ENA. 

Populated places in Southwest Region (Cameroon)
Communes of Cameroon